Harris Doran (born June 2, 1978) is an American independent film writer, director, actor, and producer.

Career

Theatre 

Doran received an Ovation Award nomination for playing "The Artful Dodger" in Oliver! at Deaf West Theatre. He played "Claude" on Broadway in the Actors Fund of America concert of Hair.

Doran won a New York Musical Theatre Festival Award for Best Actor for his work in the Off-Broadway play "Love Jerry". He played "Ham" in the out of town tryout of the stage adaptation of Harry Connick Jr's The Happy Elf. He played "Miles" in the Off-Broadway play "It Must Be Him, and "Marc" in the world premiere of "I'm Connecticut".

Writing and directorial
Doran made his writer/director debut short film "The Story of Milo & Annie" starring Cathy Moriarty which won Best Narrative Short in the Indie Memphis Film Festival, and produced the short film "photo op" starring Randy Harrison.

He has written the stage musicals "Salvage," "Wasp Woman," and "Bleeding Love" as well as pop songs including "Falling Away" for Marion Raven.

Doran was a writer on Lifetime's "I Love You... But I Lied."

Doran wrote and directed the feature film Beauty Mark, which premiered as a US competition film in the LA Film Festival and for which Doran was shortlisted for the Independent Spirit Awards' Someone To Watch Award. The film was released in 2018 by The Orchard.

Doran directed the podcast musical "Bleeding Love" and the film "I See You and You See Me" for Queens Theatre which premiered on PBS.

Doran wrote and directed the short film "F^¢k 'Em R!ght B@¢k" which premiered in The Sundance Film Festival.

Filmography

References

External links 
 official site
 Beauty Mark official site
 

1978 births
Juilliard School alumni
Fiorello H. LaGuardia High School alumni
Living people